Narok Airport is an airport in Narok, Kenya.

Location
Narok Airport, is located in Narok County, in the southwestern part of the Republic of Kenya, close to the International border with the Republic of Tanzania. The geographic coordinates of this airport are:1° 9' 0.00"S, 35° 46' 1.00"E (Latitude: -1.150000; Longitude:35.766945).

Overview
Narok Airport is a small airport that serves the town of Narok and surrounding communities. The airport receives unscheduled service from various aircharter service providers and private airplane owners.

Airlines and destinations
At the moment there is no regular, scheduled airline service to Narok Airport.

See also
 Kenya Airports Authority
 Kenya Civil Aviation Authority
 List of airports in Kenya

References

External links
  Location of Narok Airport At Google Maps
  Website of Kenya Airports Authority
  Airkenya Flight Routes

Airports in Kenya
Airports in Rift Valley Province
Narok County